Joonas Laurikainen (born May 19, 1983) is a Finnish football coach and a former player. He manages the Under-19 squad of Ilves.

Career
He represented FF Jaro in the Veikkausliiga, the Finnish premier division of football.

References

Living people
1983 births
Finnish footballers
Finnish expatriate footballers
FC Jazz players
Finnish expatriate sportspeople in Sweden
FF Jaro players
Expatriate footballers in Sweden
Association football midfielders
Association football defenders
Footballers from Turku
FC Inter Turku players
Kaarinan Pojat players
Finnish football managers
TPS Turku football managers